Dawson Head is a high coastal point, or headland, along the northwest side of Lehrke Inlet on the east coast of Palmer Land, Antarctica. It was mapped by the United States Geological Survey in 1974, and named by the Advisory Committee on Antarctic Names for Captain Opie L. Dawson, commanding officer of the USCGC Glacier during the International Weddell Sea Oceanographic Expedition, 1968.

References
 

Headlands of Palmer Land